HMS Sultan is a shore base of the Royal Navy in Gosport, Hampshire, England.  It is the primary engineering training establishment for the Royal Navy and home to the Network Rail Advanced Apprenticeship Scheme and the EDF Energy engineering maintenance apprenticeship. It is expected that HMS Sultan will close in the near future, but "no earlier than 2029".

The site was originally RAF Gosport it was then transferred to the Royal Navy during 1945 as HMS Siskin (Hence a nearby school being named Siskin School) it was then renamed HMS Sultan on 1 June 1956 when the airfield side was closed down and a Mechanical Repair Establishment was moved here from the Flathouse area by Portsmouth Dockyard.

A Better Defence Estate, published in November 2016, indicated that the Ministry of Defence intend on disposing of HMS Sultan by 2026. It was proposed that Submarine Engineer Training would move to HM Naval Base Clyde in 2024, Mechanical Engineering Training to HMS Collingwood in 2025 and the Admiralty Interview Board to HM Naval Base Portsmouth in 2026. However, in March 2019 the Ministry of Defence announced that closure would be delayed to 2029 at the earliest.

First World War
 No. 5 Squadron Royal Flying Corps between 6 July and 14 August 1914 with the Sopwith Tabloid, Royal Aircraft Factory B.E.1, Sopwith Three-seater and Farman MF.7 Longhorn
 No. 8 Squadron Royal Flying Corps between 6 January and 15 April 1915 with the Royal Aircraft Factory B.E.2C, B.E.2A and B.E.2B 
 No. 13 Squadron Royal Flying Corps formed here on 10 January and moved to St-Omer on 19 October 1915, it used the B.E.2C and Bristol Scout
 No. 14 Squadron Royal Flying Corps between 5 August and 7 November 1915 with the Longhorn, BE2C and Caudron G.3
 No. 17 Squadron Royal Flying Corps reformed here on 1 February 1915 with the BE2C. It moved to Hounslow on 5 August 1915
 No. 22 Squadron Royal Flying Corps formed here on 1 September 1915 with a variety of aircraft, it moved to St-Omer on 1 April 1916
 No. 23 Squadron Royal Flying Corps formed here on 1 September 1915 and used a variety of aircraft until 15 March 1916 when it moved to St-Omer
 No. 28 Squadron Royal Flying Corps formed here on 7 November 1915 with a variety of aircraft until 23 July 1917 when it moved to RAF Yatesbury
 No. 29 Squadron Royal Flying Corps formed here on 7 November 1915 with a variety of aircraft. It moved to St-Omer on 25 March 1916
 'B' Flight of No. 31 Squadron Royal Flying Corps formed here on 18 January 1916, staying until 1 March 1916 when the unit moved to Risalpur
 A detachment of No. 39 Squadron Royal Flying Corps from 30 June 1916
 No. 40 Squadron Royal Flying Corps formed here on 26 February 1916 with the B.E.2C and Avro 504 until 19 August 1916 when the unit moved to St-Omer
 No. 41 Squadron Royal Flying Corps formed here initially on 15 April 1916 before disbanding on 22 May 1916. The unit reformed here again on 14 July 1916 with the Vickers F.B.5, Airco DH.2 and Royal Aircraft Factory F.E.8. Staying until 15 October 1916 when the unit moved to St-Omer
 No. 45 Squadron Royal Flying Corps formed here on 1 March 1916 with a variety of aircraft including the Martinsyde S.1 and Avro 504, staying until 3 May 1916 when it moved to Thetford
 No. 56 Squadron Royal Flying Corps formed here on 8 June 1916 using a variety of aircraft until 14 July 1916 when it mvoved to London Colney
 No. 60 Squadron Royal Flying Corps formed here on 15 May 1916 using the Morane-Saulnier H until 228 May 1916 when the unit moved to the St-Omer
 A detachment of No. 78 Squadron Royal Flying Corps from 25 December 1916
 No. 79 Squadron Royal Flying Corps formed here on 1 August 1917 using various aircraft until 8 August 1917 when the unit moved to Beaulieu
 No. 81 Squadron Royal Flying Corps formed here on 7 January 1917 using various aircraft until 15 January 1917 when the unit moved to Scampton
 No. 88 Squadron Royal Flying Corps formed here on 24 July 1917 using various aircraft until 2 August 1917 when the unit moved to Harling Road
Units
 No. 1 Squadron RNAS
 No. 1 Training Squadron was disbanded here on 2 August 1917 and merged with No. 27 Training Squadron and No. 55 Training Squadron to become School of Special Flying, Gosport
 No. 1 School of Special Flying from 18 May 1918 until 1 July 1918 when the unit became the Southwestern Area Flying Instructors School RAF
 7th Wing Royal Flying Corps
 Anti-Aircraft Special Defence Flight formed here during October 1918 but was disbanded during December 1918
 Southwestern Area Flying Instructors School was formed here on 1 July 1918 and disbanded here on 26 February 1919
 No. 10 Training Squadron
 No. 17 (Training) Group
 17th Wing Royal Flying Corps
 No. 27 Reserve Squadron
 No. 27 Training Squadron
 No. 55 Training Squadron
 No. 59 Reserve Squadron
 No. 62 Reserve Squadron
 No. 70 Training Squadron
 No. 87 (Canadian) Reserve Squadron
 No. 91 (Canadian) Reserve Squadron

Inter war years
 No. 3 Squadron RAF from 8 November 1922 with the Supermarine Walrus until being disbanded on 1 April 1923
 A detachment of No. 42 Squadron RAF from 11 March 1938
 No. 186 Squadron RAF from 17 February 1919 with the Cuckoo until 1 February 1920 when the unit was disbanded
 No. 210 Squadron RAF reformed here on 1 February 1920 with the Cuckoo until 1 April 1923 when the unit disbanded 
 A detachment of No. 224 Squadron RAF from 17 January 1938 with the Avro Anson I 
Units
 No. 1 Coast Artillery Co-operation Flight formed here on 14 December 1936 using the Hawker Hart, Hawker Osprey III and Fairey Seal until 1 June 1937 when the unit was disbanded and became No. 1 Coast Artillery Co-operation Unit. It was redesignated back to its old name on 18 May 1941 but reverted to the newer name on 12 January 1942 
 No. 17 Group Communications Flight was formed here during August 1938
 The Coastal Defence Development Unit was formed here on 1 April 1935 and was disbanded on 14 December 1936
 The Coast Defence Training Flight was disbanded here on 1 August 1933 to become No. 1 Coastal Defence Training Unit
 The Coastal Battery Co-operation Flight was formed here on 23 December 1919 and was disbanded here during September 1921
 The Coastal Battery Co-operation School Flight was formed here during September 1919 and disbanded here on 23 December 1919 to become the Coastal Battery Co-operation Flight
 The Development Squadron, Gosport was formed here on 17 August 1918 and disbanded on 31 December 1918. It was merged with elements from No. 185 Squadron RAF to become No. 186 (Development) Squadron
 The Eagle Trials Flight was formed here on 1 April 1920 and was disbanded during October 1920
 The School of Aerial Co-operation with Coastal Defence Batteries was formed here on 31 January 1918 and was disbanded during September 1919 to become the Coastal Battery Co-operation School
 The Torpedo Development Flight was formed here during 1925 and disbanded during November 1938 to become the Torpedo Development Section
 The Torpedo Development Section
 The Torpedo Development Unit was formed here on 22 June 1939 and disbanded on 15 September 1943 to beceom the Aircraft Torpedo Development Unit
 The Torpedo Training Squadron
 The Torpedo Training Unit was formed here during February 1936
 Royal Air Force Base Gosport was formed here on 1 October 1921 and had five different flights:
 'A' (Army and Navy Co-operation) Flight
 'B' (Telegraphist and Air Gunner) Flight
 'C' (Deck Landing) Flight
 'D' (Torpedo Training) Flight
 'E' (Experimental) Flight
 No. 409 (Fleet Fighter) Flight formed here on 7 October 1932
 No. 420 (Fleet Spotter) Flight formed here on 1 April 1923
 No. 421 (Fleet Spotter) Flight formed here on 1 April 1923
 No. 422 (Fleet Spotter) Flight formed here on 1 April 1923
 No. 423 (Fleet Spotter) Flight formed here on 21 November 1923
 No. 445 (Fleet Reconnaissance) Flight disbanded here on 3 April 1933
 No. 446 (Fleet Reconnaissance) Flight disbanded here on 3 April 1933
 No. 450 (Fleet Spotter Reconnaissance) Flight disbanded here on 3 April 1933
 No. 460 (Fleet Torpedo) Flight was formed here on 1 April 1923
 No. 461 (Fleet Torpedo) Flight formed here on 1 April 1923
 No. 462 (Fleet Torpedo) Flight formed here on 31 May 1924
 No. 463 (Fleet Torpedo) Flight formed here on 1 September 1927
 No. 464 (Fleet Torpedo) Flight formed here on 1 September 1927
 No. 465 (Fleet Torpedo) Flight formed here on 20 March 1931
 No. 466 (Fleet Torpedo) Flight formed here on 31 March 1931

Second World War
 No. 48 Squadron RAF between 30 November 1942 and 23 December 1942 with the Lockheed Hudson V, III & VI
 No. 86 Squadron RAF reformed here on 6 December 1940 with the Bristol Blenheim IV. The unit moved  to RAF Leuchars on 3 February 1941
 No. 248 Squadron RAF between 16 April and 22 May 1940 with the Bristol Blenheim IF & IVF
 No. 608 Squadron RAF between 27 August and 9 November 1942 with the Hudson V 
 No. 667 Squadron RAF formed here on 1 December 1943 and used a variety of aircraft including Boulton Paul Defiants, Hawker Hurricanes, Fairey Barracudas, Airspeed Oxfords, Vultee Vengeances and Supermarine Spitfires until 20 December 1945 when the unit was disbanded
 No. 2758 Squadron RAF Regiment
 No. 2777 Squadron RAF Regiment
 No. 2822 Squadron RAF Regiment
 No. 2837 Squadron RAF Regiment
Units
 ‘H’ Flight of No. 1 Anti-Aircraft Co-operation Unit RAF
 No. 2 Anti-Aircraft Co-operation Unit RAF was disbanded here on 14 February 1943
 ‘A’ Flight of No. 2 Anti-Aircraft Co-operation Unit became No. 1622 (Anti-Aircraft Co-operation) Flight RAF
 ‘B’ Flight of No. 2 Anti-Aircraft Co-operation Unit
 ‘D’ Flight of No. 2 Anti-Aircraft Co-operation Unit
 No. 8 Anti-Aircraft Co-operation Unit RAF
 The Aircraft Torpedo Development Unit was formed here on 15 September 1943

Cold War
 No. 163 Gliding School was disbanded here during May 1948

Additional units posted to HMS Sultan

 Royal Navy

The following units were also posted here at some point:

Current use

It is the primary engineering training establishment for the Royal Navy. It is also home to the Network Rail Advanced Apprenticeship Scheme and the EDF Energy engineering maintenance apprenticeship.

It is home to:
 Defence School of Marine Engineering
 RN Air Engineering and Survival School
 Nuclear Department
 Volunteer Cadet Corps National Centre

Cadets

HMS Sultan is home to a number of units of the Volunteer Cadet Corps:
 HMS Sultan Royal Naval Volunteer Cadet Corps
 Gosport Division Royal Marines Volunteer Cadet Corps
 Band of the Royal Marines Volunteer Cadet Corps Gosport
 Volunteer Cadet Corps Training Centre
 Volunteer Cadet Corps Field Gun
 Headquarters Volunteer Cadet Corps

See also
 List of Royal Navy shore establishments

References

Citations

Bibliography

External links
 
 Volunteer Cadet Corps

Gosport
Nuclear research institutes in the United Kingdom
Royal Navy bases in Hampshire
Royal Navy shore establishments
Science and technology in Hampshire
Training establishments of the Royal Navy